= Babiiha Jane Alisemera =

Ugandan politician

Babiiha Jane Alisemera is a politician and consultant in Uganda. She is affiliated to the National Resistance Movement party and serves as the Commissioner National Resistance Movement Electoral Commission. She has been a Member of Parliament for 10 years where she chaired the Women’s Parliamentarians Association. She served as Chair of the Association of Former Members of Parliament.

== Career ==
Alisemera is a nurse by profession. She chaired the Association of Former Members of Parliament.
